Allen John Lynch (30 July 1938 – 6 June 2021) was an Australian rules footballer who played for the Fitzroy Football Club in the Victorian Football League (VFL).

Football

Saturday, 6 July 1963
On 6 July 1963, playing at full-back, he was a member of the young and inexperienced Fitzroy team that comprehensively and unexpectedly defeated Geelong, 9.13 (67) to 3.13 (31) in the 1963 Miracle Match.

See also
 1963 Miracle Match

Notes

References

External links 
 
 

2021 deaths
1938 births
Australian rules footballers from Tasmania
Fitzroy Football Club players
Launceston Football Club players